is a Japanese manga artist and illustrator, best known for the creation of the Kissxsis series. His first major commercial work was in collaboration with writer Bunjūrō Nakayama as the illustrator of Mahoromatic. He has been active since 1990, and started his career making hentai dōjinshi. His first work was the series I like, because I like in the hentai manga magazine Dolphin Comics, starting in 1994. He has penned six hentai manga (one, Kibun Kibun, being two volumes long and also adapted into an anime), and four general manga. He enjoys shōjo manga as well. Several of his series contain omorashi as a main element.

List of works

Hentai 
 I like, because I like (1995) Reprint: (2000)
 Seinaru Gyouzui (1996)
 nothing but... (1997) Reprint: (2000)
 Kibun Kibun (1999–2001: 2 volumes)
 Super Love Potion (2005)

Other Manga 
 Mahoromatic (1999–2004: 8 volumes, art only)
 Fight Ippatsu! Jūden-chan!! (2006–2013: 10 volumes)
 Kissxsis (2005–2021: 25 volumes)
 Shougakusei Ga Mama Demo Ii Desuka?  (2017–2020: 4 volumes)

References 

Living people
Manga artists from Aichi Prefecture
Year of birth missing (living people)